Triclonella determinatella is a moth in the family Cosmopterigidae. It is found in North America, where it has been recorded from Alabama, Arkansas, Florida, Illinois, Kansas, Louisiana, Mississippi, Oklahoma and Texas.

The wingspan is about 10 mm. Adults have been recorded on wing in January and from March to October.

References

Natural History Museum Lepidoptera generic names catalog

Cosmopteriginae
Moths of North America
Moths described in 1873